The Kenny Everett Television Show is a comedy sketch show broadcast on BBC1 from 1981 to 1988. It was presented by its main performer Kenny Everett, who wrote the material with Barry Cryer and Ray Cameron. Later in 1986 they were joined by writing team Andrew Marshall and David Renwick after Cameron's departure the previous year. It was similar in style to Everett's previous programme The Kenny Everett Video Show, broadcast on ITV from 1978 to 1981, but with greater emphasis on comedy sketches than musical numbers. However, each edition would still have at least one music act. A total 47 episodes, including 6 Christmas specials and 2 compilations over 5 series, were produced by the BBC, broadcast between 24 December 1981 and 18 January 1988 inclusive.

Background 
In 1981, Everett was increasingly unhappy with Thames Television over the management and scheduling of The Kenny Everett Video Show. One of his main complaints was that the show was directly scheduled at the same time as Top of the Pops on Thursday evenings, which took a hit on the ratings. Shortly after Series 4 had finished broadcasting, after some failed negotiations Everett decided not to renew his contract with Thames. In October of that year, he returned to the BBC, when he presented a weekly Saturday show on BBC Radio 2. The BBC were looking for a new prime sketch show, to fill the void since the loss of Morecambe and Wise to Thames three years earlier, and saw potential for doing a sketch show series with Everett. For his new BBC show,  he brought over two of his writing collaborators who had worked with him on the Video Show, Barry Cryer and Ray Cameron, who had defected with him from Thames. They were joined by producer James Moir whose credits notably included The Generation Game and The Mike Yarwood Show, along with director  Bill Wilson who had previously worked with Moir on the first two series of Not the Nine O'Clock News. Moir would ultimately produce only the first show; shortly after its recording, the Director General, Alistair Milne, promoted Moir to Head of Variety, leaving Wilson to take over producing responsibilities. Wilson who was unfamiliar with Everett's work over at Thames wanted to go in a different direction to what had gone before. This show would have a larger budget, bigger guest stars, longer periods of filming and taping the show before a studio audience, much in contrast to the comparatively low budget production of the Thames series which was filmed at smaller studios and without an audience.

Overview 
The show's format was similar to his previous show with a mixture of comedy sketches and musical interludes, Everett had even brought over old characters like Marcel Wave, Angry of Mayfair, Brother Lee Love and Sid Snot from his previous show, despite accusations from Thames over the copyright of these characters. He also created a slew of new characters including Gizzard Puke, a philosophical punk who shares many similarities with his earlier character Sid Snot; Maurice Mimer, a mime artist whose drawings turn into real objects; Reg Prescott, an inept TV handyman whose D.I.Y. demonstrations often lead to horrific injuries; General Cheeseburger, a US Army General with oversized shoulders adorned with medals and hand grenades, whose monologues were seen as a satire on US foreign policy; Verity Treacle, an agony aunt who often receives requests by viewers to kill off celebrities in various elaborate ways; and Cupid Stunt, a vociferous B-movie actress, who is often seen giving interviews about her eventful career to a cardboard cut out of Michael Parkinson, where she rounds off each interview with the iconic catchphrase "It's all done in the best possible taste!" Moreover, he also parodied popular shows at the time including Dallas and Dynasty which were merged to become 'Dallasty', along with well-known fictional characters like Spider-Man, Beau Geste and Hinge & Bracket.

Everett was aided by an extensive supporting cast who included Cleo Rocos, Sheila Steafal, Lou Hirsch, Billy Connolly, John Arnatt and Willie Rushton, along with a long list of  celebrity guest stars who continuously sent themselves up, the likes of Frank Thornton, Brian Blessed, Lionel Blair, Burt Kwouk, Lulu, Tim Brooke-Taylor, Joanna Lumley, Lennie Bennett, Terry Wogan, Mel Smith and Vikki Michelle, who made frequent appearances on the show. In addition to the main pool of writers involved in the show, a number of other writers also submitted various sketches to the show, including Paul Alexander, Simon Booker, Neil Shand, Paul Minett and Dick Vosburgh, the last of whom had previously worked with Everett on his show at Thames. The show was a ratings success for the BBC, repeatedly drawing audiences of around 12-13 million viewers per episode. When the show hit the screens in early 1982, it was lauded by critics; Hilary Kingsley from the Daily Mirror commented "the first Kenny Everett show was tatty, tasteless and trivial. I loved it!." Everett was praised for his inventive comedy style that went against the norm for sketch shows; it was seen as zany, daring and unique, although at times the humour bordered on the grisly and squirm inducing. Towards the end of the show's run in 1987 the reception had changed, it was beginning to look tired and old fashioned as James Green commented in a review for The Stage in December 1987, with its formula of bawdy and surreal humour barely changing over the years. After Series 5 had ended in January 1988, Everett decided not to renew his contract with the BBC due to his growing disillusion with the filming of the show and faltering professional relations with his co-writers. Despite the BBC's intentions for the show to continue, it came to an abrupt end when Everett opted out from doing more shows.

Episodes

Christmas Special (1981)

Series 1 (1982)

Christmas Special (1982)

Series 2 (1983)

Specials (1983-1984)

Series 3 (1985)

Christmas Special (1985)

Series 4 (1986)

Christmas Special (1986)

Series 5 (1987- 1988)

Syndication 
Since the show was last broadcast in January 1988, no complete episodes from this show have ever been repeated on the BBC, but the show was often repeated in its entirety on UK Gold during the 1990s, and more recently on Paramount Comedy starting from the 4 February 2008. A few months after Everett's death in April 1995, the BBC broadcast two compilation episodes titled 'The Best of the Kenny Everett Shows' over two consecutive weeks on BBC1 between 19 and 25 September 1995. A few years later on 1 March 1999, the BBC released a compilation of his shows on DVD and VHS, titled 'Kenny Everett: In the Best Possible Taste'. The complete series has yet to be released on DVD.

External links 
 The Kenny Everett Television Show at IMDb
 The Kenny Everett Television Show at British Comedy Guide
 The Kenny Everett Television Show at TVDB
 The Ultimate Kenny Everett Sketch Site, BBC Episodes

References 

1981 British television series debuts
1988 British television series endings
1980s British television sketch shows
BBC television sketch shows
British black comedy television shows
British satirical television series
English-language television shows
Metafictional television series
Postmodernism
Self-reflexive television
British surreal comedy television series